The Boss of Camp 4 is a 1922 American silent action film directed by W. S. Van Dyke and starring Buck Jones, Fritzi Brunette, G. Raymond Nye, Francis Ford, and Sid Jordan. It is based on the novel by Arthur Preston Hankins with the same name. The film was released by Fox Film Corporation on November 26. 1922.

Cast
Buck Jones as Chet Fanning (as Charles Jones)
Fritzi Brunette as Iris Paxton
G. Raymond Nye as Dave Miller
Francis Ford as Dude McCormick
Sid Jordan as Warren Zome
Milton Ross as Andrew Paxton

Preservation
The film is now considered lost.

References

External links

1920s action films
American action films
1922 films
American silent feature films
American black-and-white films
Fox Film films
Lost American films
Films based on American novels
1922 lost films
Silent action films
1920s American films